Kafubu Stadium is a multi-use stadium in Luanshya, Zambia.  It is currently used mostly for football matches, on club level by Roan United F.C. of the Zambian Premier League. The stadium has a capacity of 8,000 spectators.

References

Football venues in Zambia
Luanshya
Buildings and structures in Copperbelt Province